The kishu mikan (Citrus kinokuni ex Tanaka) is a hybrid variety of mikan, or mandarin orange (Citrus reticulata), found in Southern China and also grown in Japan. It is not closely related to the common sweet orange, but it is closely related to the mandarin orange.

The fruit is also known as Baby Mandarin, Tiny Tangerine, Mini Mandarin and Kishu Mandarin. It is sold under the brand name "Cherry orange" in Europe. The fruit's orange skin is thin and smooth.

Some varieties of kishu, such as the mukakukishu, are seedless. The species is used in creating seedless hybrid citrus. The largest variety is the hirakishu.

History 

The fruit is thought to have arisen in Southern China; it is believed to have been grown since the 700's. Its name was recorded in the records of Jianchang during the Ming Dynasty, and its agricultural growth is widespread in Jiangxi province. The variety was introduced to Japan around 1200 and remained the most popular citrus in Tokyo until the eighteen hundreds.

Genetic studies have found it to be closely related to the Huanglingmiao mandarin, carrying the same pomelo (Citrus maxima) introgression, indicating that the two diverged from the same backcrossed domesticated ancestor. Under the Tanaka system of citrus taxonomy, it is a separate species named Citrus kinokuni, while the Swingle system groups it with other pure and hybrid mandarins as a single species, Citrus reticulata.

Kishu mikans were introduced to America in the eighteen hundreds but were not widely known. A seedless cultivar was developed for commercial production starting in 1983 at the University of California Citrus Research Center, and the fruit is now commercially available at specialty markets throughout California. It was first grown commercially in the US in the 1990s, and started to be widely grown in the United States around 2010.

The fruit was made available in Europe in 2006.

Taste 
The fruit is high in vitamin C, like other mandarins. The fruit is enveloped in a thin skin and has 7–19 sections. One variety is seedless; others have seeds.

Cultivation 
Kishu mikan plants are small evergreen and perennial trees. They grow rapidly to a size of about  diameter and  height. They are commonly planted in household gardens in Japan and additionally grown in greenhouses, balconies, and in commercial orchards.

The trees require five hours of sun each day and temperatures ranging from .They thrive on high humidity, but require well-drained soil. Manual transfer of pollen between blossoms may improve yield.

The fruit grows to  size and is harvested in mid-winter: in the Northern Hemisphere, November to February, depending on the local climate. When the fruit is left on the tree for too long, it can lose its flavor. Trees may fruit in their first year and typically yield  of fruit annually.

The fruit needs to be handled with care to avoid damage to the outer skin.

See also 
Citrus taxonomy
Japanese citrus
Komikan (fruit)

References 

Citrus
Fruits originating in East Asia
Garden plants